New Age Grime is an album by Maniac, released after his split vocal and instrumental collaboration with Tinchy Stryder Tinchy Stryder vs. Maniac, it represented Maniac's first and only solo instrumental LP. The album was well received in the Grime scene and has been recognised as one of the best examples of Grime as an instrumental genre.

Track listing

References

External links
 New Age Grime - Frankstah's Review. ogfrankstah.wordpress.com
 New Age Grime - CD, Amazon.com. Amazon.

2009 compilation albums
Maniac (producer) albums